Muhammed Samed Karakoç (born 30 June 1997) is a Turkish professional footballer who plays as a midfielder, generally as a right winger, for 24 Erzincanspor.

Professional career
Samed made his professional debut for Fenerbahçe in a Süper Lig 2-2 tie with Göztepe on 12 August 2017.

For the 2018–19 season Samed was loaned out to third tier Turkish club Tarsus İdman Yurdu. He has played 33 games and scored 9 goals.

References

External links
 
 
 

1997 births
People from Tokat
Living people
Turkish footballers
Turkey youth international footballers
Association football midfielders
Fenerbahçe S.K. footballers
Tarsus Idman Yurdu footballers
Hatayspor footballers
Ankara Demirspor footballers
24 Erzincanspor footballers
Şanlıurfaspor footballers
Süper Lig players
TFF First League players
TFF Second League players